FK506 binding protein 6, also known as FKBP6, is a human gene.  The encoded protein shows structural homology to FKBP immunophilins, which bind to the immunosuppressants FK506 and rapamycin.

FKBP6 is essential for homologous chromosome pairing in meiosis during spermatogenesis.  Targeted inactivation of FKBP6 in mice results in infertile males, but apparently normal females.  Rats with spermatogenic failure at meiosis were found to have a deletion in the exon 8 portion of the FKBP6 gene. Mutations in this gene have been associated with male infertility in humans.

FKBP6 is deleted in Williams syndrome, however this hemizygous loss of FKBP6 is not associated with infertility.

FKBP6 contains 3 α-helices and 11 β-sheet strands, and as a FK506-family protein, has been shown to be a potent immunosuppressant which can assist in the prevention of allograft rejections.

References

EC 5.2.1